The Standing Committee on European Integration is a specialized committee of the parliament of Armenia, which oversees the management of relations between Armenia and the European Union, and supports the gradual European integration of the country.

History

The Standing Committee on European Integration, established in 2007, is one of eleven standing committees of the National Assembly of Armenia. Members serving on the committee are elected members of parliament, representing most political parties with representation in parliament. However, leaders and representatives from extra-parliamentary political parties often participate in meetings as observers or regular attendees. The committee meets monthly and provides suggestions, updates, and reports to the Prime Minister of Armenia, Nikol Pashinyan.

Several political parties have been accredited observer status to the committee. The pro-European Republic Party and the European Party of Armenia participate on the committee as observers. On 7 February 2022, Tigran Khzmalyan, the Chairman of the European Party of Armenia stated that, "We will try to politicize your work, as this committee is key for us. We are convinced that the European integration committee is the axis where security, economic development, and many other issues should be resolved."

Objectives
The primary objectives of the committee is to further develop Armenia–European Union relations, ensure the implementation of the Armenia-EU Comprehensive and Enhanced Partnership Agreement, and continue the gradual harmonization of Armenian laws and regulations to the legal acts of the EU acquis.

Activities

On 29 December 2020, committee members met with EU Ambassador to Armenia Andrea Wiktorin. The participants of the meeting discussed a wide range of issues, in particular, the prospects of deepening Armenia–EU cooperation.

On 24 October 2021, Arman Yeghoyan held a meeting with members of the Italian senate. The sides discussed further developing inter-parliamentary ties and economic activities between Italy, the EU, and Armenia.

In January 2022, members of the Greek Parliament held meetings with the committee and discussed increasing cooperation in various sectors.

In February 2022, the committee ratified Armenia's membership in Horizon Europe.

On 1 November 2022, members of the committee held a meeting with members of the European Parliament in Yerevan. A wide range of issues were discussed including expanding Armenia–European Union relations and maintaining stability in the Caucasus region.

On 23 February 2023, Arman Yeghoyan held a meeting with the Deputy of the European Parliament, François Alfons. Alfons stated, "The European Parliament is interested in the activities of the Standing Committee on European Integration" and emphasized the work done by the latter with various EU bodies. The possibility of joint programs in different formats were discussed. It was also emphasized that the role and importance of the Standing Committee on European Integration is increasing daily.

On 17 March 2023, Armenian deputy foreign minister Paruyr Hovhannisyan stated that relations between Armenia and EU member states have been increasing over the past year and are more dynamic. The minister applauded the efforts of the European Union Mission in Armenia and stated that the EU has significantly contributed to the security and stabilization of the South Caucasus, during a meeting of the Standing Committee.

Leadership
The committee Chairman is Arman Yeghoyan. Mary Galstyan acts as the Deputy Chair. Both are members of the ruling Civil Contract party. There are a total of 10 members of parliament who sit on the committee.

See also

 Armenia in the Council of Europe
 Eastern Partnership
 Euronest Parliamentary Assembly
 European Integration NGO
 EU Strategy for the South Caucasus
 Foreign relations of Armenia
 Politics of Armenia
 Potential enlargement of the European Union

References

External links
 Standing Committee on European Integration Official website
 Standing Committee on European Integration on Facebook

Armenia–European Union relations
European integration
Foreign relations of Armenia
Standing Committee on European Integration
Politics of Armenia
2007 in Armenia